Rafati (related either to the Arabic Muslim masculine given name Rafaat or Rifat) is an Arabic and Persian language surname which is also to be found among the Iranian diaspora. Notable people with the surname include:

 Babak Rafati (born 1970), former Iranian-German football referee
 Jami Rafati (born 1994), Iranian-Italian footballer
 Shahrzad Rafati (born 1980), Canadian chief executive of Iranian descent

References 

Persian-language surnames